Play: The Videos is a compilation DVD of music videos by Peter Gabriel, released in 2004. The DVD contains remastered audio tracks of songs in DTS 5.1 (DTS 96 kHz/24-bit) and Dolby Digital 5.1 Surround Sound. The new surround sound mixes were created by Daniel Lanois and Richard Chappell.

Track list
"Father, Son"
"Sledgehammer"
"Blood of Eden"
"Games Without Frontiers"
"I Don't Remember"
"Big Time"
"Lovetown"
"Red Rain"
"In Your Eyes"
"Don't Give Up"
"The Barry Williams Show"
"Washing of the Water"
"Biko"
"Kiss That Frog"
"Mercy Street"
"Growing Up"
"Shaking the Tree"
"Shock the Monkey"
"Steam"
"The Drop"
"Zaar"
"Solsbury Hill"
"Digging in the Dirt"

Certifications

External links
Review - The Music Box, Vol. 12, #6

References

Peter Gabriel video albums
2004 video albums
Rhino Entertainment video albums

it:Play (Peter Gabriel)